23S rRNA (guanine1835-N2)-methyltransferase (ygjO (gene), rlmG (gene), ribosomal RNA large subunit methyltransferase G) is an enzyme with systematic name S-adenosyl-L-methionine:23S rRNA (guanine1835-N2)-methyltransferase. This enzyme catalyses the following chemical reaction

 S-adenosyl-L-methionine + guanine1835 in 23S rRNA  S-adenosyl-L-homocysteine + N2-methylguanine1835 in 23S rRNA

The enzyme methylates 23S rRNA in vitro, assembled 50S subunits are not a substrate.

References

External links 
 

EC 2.1.1